AirPods Pro are wireless Bluetooth in-ear headphones designed by Apple, initially released on October 30, 2019. They are Apple's mid-range wireless headphones, sold alongside the base-level AirPods and highest-end AirPods Max.

The first-generation AirPods Pro use the H1 chip found in second-generation AirPods, but add active noise cancellation, transparency mode, automated frequency profile setting, IPX4 water resistance, a charging case with wireless charging, and interchangeable silicone tips.

The second-generation AirPods Pro were announced in September 2022, and feature the H2 chip, Bluetooth 5.3 connectivity, improved sound quality and noise cancellation, longer battery life, volume adjusting gestures, Find My tracking, Apple Watch charger compatibility and extra-small sized ear tips.

Models

First generation 
Apple announced AirPods Pro on October 28, 2019, and released them two days later on October 30, 2019. They include features of standard AirPods, such as a microphone that filters out background noise, accelerometers and optical sensors that can detect presses on the stem and in-ear placement, and automatic pausing when they are taken out of the ears. Control by tapping is replaced by pressing a force sensor on the stems. They are rated IPX4 for water resistance.

The AirPods Pro use the H1 chip also found in the second and third-generation AirPods, that supports hands-free "Hey Siri". They have active noise cancellation, accomplished by microphones detecting outside sound and speakers producing precisely opposite "anti-noise". Active noise cancellation can be turned off or switched to "transparency mode" that helps users hear surroundings. Noise cancellation modes can also be switched in iOS or by pinching the stems of the AirPods using the force sensor.

The H1 chip is embedded in a unique system in a package (SiP) module enclosing several other components, such as the audio processor and accelerometers.

Battery life is rated to be equal to the second-generation AirPods at five hours, but noise cancellation or transparency mode reduce it to 4.5 hours due to the extra processing. The charging case advertises the same 24 hours of total listening time as the standard AirPods case. It also features Qi standard wireless charging compatibility. In October 2021, Apple updated the bundled charging case with MagSafe. Like AirPods, AirPods Pro have received criticism for their battery life.

AirPods Pro come with three sizes of silicone tips. There is a software test in iOS called the Ear Tip Fit Test that "[checks] the fit of your AirPods ear tips to determine which size provides the best seal and acoustic performance" to ensure a correct fit, as well as a feature called "Adaptive EQ" which automatically adjusts the frequency contour, claimed to better match the wearer's ear shape. Starting in early 2020, Apple started selling tip replacements for AirPods Pro on their website.

With iOS 14 and iPadOS 14, Apple added a spatial audio mode designed to simulate 5.1 surround sound. Supported apps include the Apple TV app, Disney+, HBO Max and Netflix. Spatial audio requires an iPhone or iPad with an Apple A10 processor or newer. tvOS 15 brought spatial audio to the Apple TV 4K.

iOS 14 also added the ability to apply headphone accommodations to transparency mode, allowing the AirPods Pro to act as rudimentary hearing aids. In October 2021, a new Conversation Boost mode was added as a customization of the regular Transparency mode. It boosts voices above background noise and music.

Second generation 
The second-generation AirPods Pro were announced at an Apple media event on September 7, 2022, and were released on September 23, 2022. They use an updated H2 chip with Bluetooth 5.3 connectivity, and feature improved sound quality and noise cancellation, and longer battery life. They also include extra-small sized ear tips, and AirPods support swiping up and down to adjust volume. Ear tips are physically compatible with first generation AirPods Pro as they use the same connector, but Apple notes the second generation ear tips use a less dense mesh and recommends against intermixing them for acoustical consistency.

The charging case includes an Apple U1 chip that supports Find My tracking, and includes a speaker for locating and status updates. In addition to Lightning, Qi and MagSafe chargers, it is also compatible with Apple Watch chargers. A lanyard loop was also added to the side of the case.

Compatibility
Support for AirPods Pro was added in iOS 13.2, watchOS 6.1, tvOS 13.2, and macOS Catalina 10.15.1. They are compatible with any device that supports Bluetooth, including Windows and Android devices, although certain features such as automatic switching between devices are only available on Apple devices using its iCloud service.

See also
 Apple headphones
EarPods
AirPods
AirPods Max
 Google Pixel Buds
 Samsung Galaxy Buds

References

External links
 

Apple Inc. peripherals
iPhone accessories
Headphones
Products introduced in 2019